The 920th Field Artillery Battalion was a U.S. Army artillery unit that fought in World War II.  The battalion was attached to the U.S. 95th Infantry Division when activated, in June 1942.

920